Neetan Chouhan (born 3 April 1983) is a Zimbabwean cricketer. He played twenty first-class matches between 2000 and 2007.

See also
 CFX Academy cricket team

References

External links
 

1983 births
Living people
Zimbabwean cricketers
CFX Academy cricketers
Mashonaland A cricketers
Northerns cricketers
Titans cricketers
Sportspeople from Harare